Furcula borealis, the white furcula moth, is a moth of the  family Notodontidae. It is found from New Hampshire to Texas and Florida, as well as in Colorado and South Dakota.

The wingspan is 31–42 mm. Adults are on wing from April to August.

The larvae feed on Prunus avium, Salix and Populus species.

Taxonomy
The species has been treated as a subspecies of the Furcula bicuspis, but has been elevated back to species status.

References

Moths described in 1832
Notodontidae
Moths of North America